Voice of the People – VOX humana is a local political party in Härjedalen, Sweden. The party was formed ahead of the 2002 elections. Party president is Pelle Persson.

The party has 75 members as of 2005. 

In the 2002 municipal elections it got 721 votes (10.8%) and five seats.

External links
 Party website

Swedish local political parties